Stronend (511 m) is the highest peak of the Fintry Hills in Stirlingshire, Scotland. Standing above the village of Fintry, it provides excellent views of Loch Lomond and The Trossachs to the north.

References

Mountains and hills of Stirling (council area)
Marilyns of Scotland
Hills of the Scottish Midland Valley